Frank Broers (born August 29, 1977 in Alkmaar, Netherlands) is a Dutch retired football defender.

Club career
He made his debut in Dutch professional football on March 14, 1998 for NAC in a competition match against FC Twente (1-0). He later played for FC Emmen before joining Sparta in 2003. After being demoted to the reserves by then manager Wiljan Vloet, Broers left Sparta for VVV and he returned to Emmen in 2007. When he couldn't agree terms with Emmen for a new contract he left for Go Ahead Eagles in summer 2008.

He retired when he left amateur side Kozakken Boys in January 2011.

Later years
He was named physical coach and assistant to the NAC U-21 manager in summer 2013.

References

External links
Broers on Ronald Zwiers 
VI Profile

1977 births
Living people
Sportspeople from Alkmaar
Association football defenders
Dutch footballers
NAC Breda players
FC Emmen players
Sparta Rotterdam players
VVV-Venlo players
Go Ahead Eagles players
Kozakken Boys players
Eredivisie players
Eerste Divisie players
Footballers from North Holland
21st-century Dutch people